Gong Gong is a locality on the Eastern rural fringe of the City of Ballarat municipality in Victoria, Australia. The suburb is mostly state forest and contains two reservoirs, Gong Gong and Kirks, that supply Ballarat with potable water. The smaller of the two reservoirs is surrounded by parkland which contains a small ornamental garden.

References

Suburbs of Ballarat